James Davies  (1845–1910) was a Welsh international footballer. He was part of the Wales national football team, playing 1 match on 23  March 1878 against Scotland.

Career
At club level James Davies played for Wrexham. He scored the winning goal in the first Welsh Cup Final, when Wrexham defeated Druids 1–0 at Acton Park, Wrexham.

In September 1890, Davies became Chairman of the Welsh League. Davies also acted as local referee.

Davies became President of the Football Association of Wales in September 1891.

Personal life
Davies lived in Percy Road, Wrexham and was employed as a Stonemason who worked at the old Beast Market. He was also part of the volunteer fire service and a member of Wrexham Cricket Club.

Honours

Wrexham

Welsh Cup
Winners: 1877–78

See also
 List of Wales international footballers (alphabetical)

References

External links
 

1845 births
1910 deaths
Wrexham A.F.C. players
Welsh footballers
Wales international footballers
Place of birth missing
Date of death missing
Association football forwards